The Eurofly Viper is an Italian ultralight trike, designed and produced by Eurofly Srl of Galliera Veneta. The aircraft is supplied as a complete ready-to-fly-aircraft.

Design and development
It features a cable-braced hang glider-style high-wing, weight-shift controls, a two-seats-in-tandem open cockpit, tricycle landing gear with wheel pants and a single engine in pusher configuration.

The aircraft is made from welded tubing, with its double surface wing covered in Dacron sailcloth. Its  span Skyrider Hazard 12 wing is supported by a single tube-type kingpost and uses an "A" frame weight-shift control bar. The standard powerplant is a twin cylinder, liquid-cooled, two-stroke, dual-ignition  Rotax 582 engine, with the twin cylinder, air-cooled, two-stroke, dual-ignition  Rotax 503 engine optional.

A number of different wings can be fitted to the basic carriage, including the Skyrider Hazard 12 and Hazard 15. A  fuel tank is optional.

A basic version of the aircraft, powered by the  Rotax 503 engine and without fairings is also offered.

Specifications (Viper with Hazard 12 wing)

References

External links

Viper
2000s Italian sport aircraft
2000s Italian ultralight aircraft
Single-engined pusher aircraft
Ultralight trikes